It's All Adam's Fault or In Six Easy Lessons (French: C'est la faute d'Adam) is a 1958 French comedy film directed by Jacqueline Audry and starring Dany Robin, Jacques Sernas and Mijanou Bardot.

Cast
 Dany Robin as Eléonore 'Nora' de Savigny  
 Jacques Sernas as Gérard Sandret 
 Mijanou Bardot 
 Armand Bernard as L'ambassadeur  
 René Berthier 
 Maurice Biraud 
 Michèle Cordoue as Lucienne Langeac  
 Max Dalban as Jean-Loup  
 Jean Degrave 
 Paul Demange as Félicien  
 Bernard Dhéran as Le comte Philippe de Bergen  
 Jean Droze 
 Michel Etcheverry as Adam de Casaubon  
 André Gabriello as Jean-Luc  
 Léa Gray 
 Denise Grey as Jeanne Sandret  
 Suzanne Grey 
 Jacques Hilling 
 René Hiéronimus
 Robert Le Béal
 René Lefèvre as Le comte Norbert de Cazaubon  
 Elisabeth Manet as Maryse Gillet 
 Maryse Marion as Léa  
 Jacques Muller 
 Henri Nassiet as Monsieur Gillet  
 Julienne Paroli 
 Noël Roquevert as Antoine  
 Gaby Sylvia as Hélène de Bergen  
 Robert Thomas 
 Jean-Pierre Vaguer 
 Simone Vannier 
 Robert Vattier as Noël  
 Henri Virlojeux

References

Bibliography 
 Sharon Smith. Women who Make Movies. Hopkinson and Blake, 1975.

External links 
 

1958 films
1958 comedy films
French comedy films
1950s French-language films
Films directed by Jacqueline Audry
1950s French films